Chamaedorea metallica is a species of flowering plant in the family Arecaceae.

Distribution
Chamaedorea metallica is endemic in Southern Mexico.

Cultivation
Chamaedorea metallica is a garden plant in sub-tropical climates, such as coastal Southern California, and in tropical regions. It is also a popular house plant.

References
O.F.Cook ex H.E.Moore, Principes 10: 45 (1966).

metallica
Endemic flora of Mexico
House plants
Garden plants of North America
Plants described in 1966